Radek Bukač (born 12 June 1981) is a professional Czech football player who played Gambrinus liga football for Viktoria Žižkov. He was among the top scorers in the 2005–06 Czech 2. Liga.

References

External links
 Profile at FK Viktoria Žižkov website

Czech footballers
1981 births
Living people
Czech First League players
FK Viktoria Žižkov players
FC Hradec Králové players
FK Dukla Banská Bystrica players
Slovak Super Liga players
Czech National Football League players
Czech expatriate footballers
Czech expatriate sportspeople in Slovakia
Expatriate footballers in Slovakia

Association football forwards
FC Sellier & Bellot Vlašim players